St. Catherine or Katherine may refer to a number of saints, including:

Saints 
Catherine of Alexandria, Saint Catherine of the Wheel, or Great Martyr Saint Catherine (4th century)
Catherine of Vadstena (c. 1332–1381), Swedish nun and author
Catherine of Siena (1347–1380), TOSD Italian philosopher, theologian, doctor of the church and patron saint of Italy 
Catherine of Bologna (1413–1463), OSC Italian nun and artist
Catherine of Genoa (1447–1510), Genoese mystic
Catherine of Ricci (1522–1590), OP Italian nun, prioress and stigmatic
Catherine Tekakwitha or Lily of the Mohawks (1656–1680),  Algonquin–Mohawk religious figure
Catherine Labouré (1806–1876), DC French nun and Marian visionary
Caterina Volpicelli (1839–1894), Neapolitan founder of the Maids of the Sacred Heart of Jesus 
Katharine Drexel (1858–1955), SBS American sister, heiress, philanthropist and educator

See also

Blesseds

Catherine of Racconigi (1487–1574), TOSD Italian mystic and stigmatic
Catherine of St. Augustine (1632–1668), OSA French canoness who served the sick in Quebec
Catherine Jarrige (1754–1836), French worker with the poor

Female saints
Catherine